Nadezhda Bogdanova (born 22 June 2000) is a Belarusian table tennis player. Her highest career ITTF ranking was 91.

References

2000 births
Living people
Belarusian female table tennis players